FSI International, Inc. (FSI) is an American manufacturing company based in Chaska, Minnesota that supplies processing equipment used to manufacture microelectronics, including semiconductor devices.

History 
The company's history began with the establishment of Fluoroware, Inc. in 1966, a company that made fixtures to hold the silicon wafers in place during the various processes involved in producing semiconductor devices. When asked to design a drying apparatus, the principals of Fluoroware agreed to do so and established FSI International in 1973 to market this new product. 

The company's offerings expanded to meet the market need for equipment used in the fabrication of microelectronics. In the 1990s, the company relocated from its original facility overlooking Hazeltine Lake to a larger site nearby. 

In 1999, FSI International announced an agreement to acquire YieldUP International Corp. In October 2012, Tokyo Electron acquired FSI International, Inc. and renamed the division TEL FSI.

Products 
FSI International supplied surface conditioning technology solutions, using wet, cryogenic and other chemistry techniques to clean, strip or etch the surfaces of silicon wafers. The company also engaged in microlithography systems for photoresist, light-sensitive, and etch-resistant films. The company provides upgrade, replacement and other support services.
The five main series of equipment produced by the company are: ZETA, MERCURY, ORION, ANTARES, and POLARIS, and in earlier years, the company also produced the SATURN and NEPTUNE processing systems. Some of the products of the company are spray cleaning systems, single wafer cleaning systems, cryogenic processing systems, and immersion cleaning systems.

References

External links 
Official FSI International website

Semiconductor companies of the United States
Manufacturing companies based in Minnesota
Chaska, Minnesota
Electronics companies established in 1973
1973 establishments in Minnesota
Companies formerly listed on the Nasdaq